Tang Yan may refer to:

Tiffany Tang (born 1983), Chinese actress
Tang Yan (CEO), founder of software company Momo